The 1984 Player's International Canadian Open was a tennis tournament played on outdoor hard courts. The men's tournament was held at the National Tennis Centre in Toronto in Canada and was part of the 1984 Volvo Grand Prix while the women's tournament was held at the Jarry Park Stadium in Montreal in Canada and was part of the 1984 Virginia Slims World Championship Series. The men's tournament was held from August 13 through August 19, 1984, while the women's tournament was held from August 20 through August 26, 1984.

Finals

Men's singles

 John McEnroe defeated  Vitas Gerulaitis 6–0, 6–3
 It was McEnroe's 13th title of the year and the 108th of his career.

Women's singles
 Chris Evert-Lloyd defeated  Alycia Moulton 6–2, 7–6
 It was Evert-Lloyd's 4th title of the year and the 134th of her career.

Men's doubles
 Peter Fleming /  John McEnroe defeated  John Fitzgerald /  Kim Warwick 6–4, 6–2
 It was Fleming's 5th title of the year and the 52nd of his career. It was McEnroe's 14th title of the year and the 109th of his career.

Women's doubles
 Kathy Jordan /  Elizabeth Sayers defeated  Claudia Kohde-Kilsch /  Hana Mandlíková 6–1, 6–2
 It was Jordan's 2nd title of the year and the 25th of her career. It was Sayers' 1st title of the year and the 3rd of her career.

References

External links
 
 Association of Tennis Professionals (ATP) tournament profile
 Women's Tennis Association (WTA) tournament profile

Player's Canadian Open
Player's Canadian Open
Player's Canadian Open
Player's Canadian Open
Canadian Open (tennis)